The men's doubles of the 2019 Advantage Cars Prague Open tournament was played on clay in Prague, Czech Republic.

Sander Gillé and Joran Vliegen were the defending champions but chose not to defend their title.

Ariel Behar and Gonzalo Escobar won the title after defeating Andrey Golubev and Aleksandr Nedovyesov 6–7(4–7), 7–5, [10–8] in the final.

Seeds

Draw

References

External links
 Main draw

Advantage Cars Prague Open - Men's Doubles
2019 Men's Doubles